Brierley is a surname of English origin. The name may refer to:

Benjamin Brierley (1825–1896), British author
Benjamin Brierley (rugby player) (born 1986), German rugby union international
David Brierly (1935–2008), English actor
Ellen Brierley and Jennet Brierley, two of the twelve witches tried at Lancaster Assizes in August 1612 for their part in the Pendle Hill witchcraft case
Herbert Brierley English footballer
Justin W. Brierly (1905–1985), American educator and lawyer
Marjorie Brierley (1893–1984), English pioneer of psychoanalysis in Britain
Roger Brierley (1935–2005), British accountant and actor
Ron Brierley (born 1937), New Zealand investor and corporate raider
Thomas Brierley (1785–1855), British Freemason whose gravestone became a mystery
Tom Brierley (1910–1989), English and Canadian cricket player
Walter Brierley (1862–1926), English architect

English toponymic surnames